Nestani (before 1927: Τσιπιανά Tsipiana) is a village and a community in the municipal unit Mantineia, Arcadia, Greece.

Geography
It is situated at the foot of the mountain Artemisio, at about 700 m elevation. It was the seat of the former municipality Mantineia. The community Nestani also contains the village of Milea. Nestani is 11 km east of Kapsas, 13 km southwest of Lyrkeia (Argolis) and 14 km northeast of Tripoli. The Moreas Motorway (Corinth–Tripoli-Kalamata/Sparta) passes west of the village.

The monastery of Panagia Gorgoepikοos is situated on a hill immediately southeast of the village. The Holy Mother of God is venerated there, with a celebration on 15 August. The present building dates from 1740. It is now a nunnery.

Life in Nestani today 
In Arcadia agriculture, raising and herding livestock, some trading are the dominant occupations. The same is true for most residents of the village. But securing livelihood in accordance with what is locally facilitated is on the decline, as migration, particularly significant since 1945 and mainly to the Americas, promises a better life. This is one reason, why the population of Nestani is diminishing. Urbanization is another, more recent phenomenon, since better roads, improved mobility and job opportunities in Arcadias capital Tripoli and in the environment are better. The village has an annual festival on the 15th August to celebrate the Virgin Mary during which many visitors from abroad attend.

The environment 
In many Greek villages styled fountains are dedicated, vivid symbols of rural identification and tradition. The spring water fountain (φιλίππεοις Κρήνη) is a well kept, rebuilt remnant of the fountain King Philip II of Macedon (382-336 BC) built, when he camped next to the ancient town Nestane.

However, the plain Argon Pedion below the village with its peculiar properties, will be of relevance for the villages existence and further development for the years to come.

Historical population

History
Nestani was named after the ancient settlement Nestane, that was situated at the same place. Ancient Nestane was a village in the territory of the town Mantineia. The ruined acropolis of Nestani and the remnant of Philipps fountain can still be found in the village.

The village of Tsipiana, which grew near the ancient ruins of Nestane, was renamed Nestani in 1927.

See also
List of settlements in Arcadia

References

External links
Arcadia - Nestani 
 Monastery and church above Nestani   
 [Pausanias, Book 8, English translation, on Nestani and King Philip II of Macedon http://www.perseus.tufts.edu/hopper/text?doc=Perseus%3Atext%3A1999.01.0160%3Abook%3D8%3Achapter%3D7%3Asection%3D4]
 Name changes of settlements in Greece  

Populated places in Arcadia, Peloponnese
Landforms of Arcadia, Peloponnese
Plains of Greece
Karst fields